Shai (also spelt Sai, occasionally Shay, and in Greek, Psais) was the deification of the concept of fate in Egyptian mythology. As a concept, with no particular reason for associating one gender over another, Shai was sometimes considered female, rather than the more usual understanding of being male, in which circumstance Shai was referred to as Shait (simply the feminine form of the name). His name reflects his function, as it means (that which is) ordained.

As the god of fate, it was said that he determined the span of each man's life, and was present at the judgement of the soul of the deceased in the Duat. In consequence, he was sometimes identified as the husband of Meskhenet, goddess of birth, or, in later years, of Renenutet, who assigned the Ren, and had become considered goddess of fortune. Because of the power associated in the concept, Akhenaten, in introducing monotheism, said that Shai was an attribute of Aten, whereas Ramses II claimed to be lord of Shai (i.e. lord of fate).

During Ptolemaic Egypt, Shai, as god of fate, was identified with the Greek god Agathodaemon, who was the god of fortune telling. Thus, since Agathodaemon was considered to be a serpent, and the word Shai was also the Egyptian word for pig, in the Hellenic period, Shai was sometimes depicted as a serpent-headed pig, known to Egyptologists as the Shai animal.

References 

Egyptian gods
Time and fate gods
Hebrew-language given names

ca:Shait